Mas Canciones (correct form: Más canciones; Spanish for "more songs") is an album by American singer/songwriter/producer Linda Ronstadt, released in late 1991.

A significant hit in the U.S. for a non-English language album, it peaked at number 88 on the Billboard album chart, and reached number 16 on the Top Latin Albums chart. The single "Grítenme Piedras del Campo" peaked at number 15 on the Hot Latin Tracks chart.

In 2016, this album was reissued on the Rhino label after several years out of print.

History

Mas Canciones was released four years after the release of Ronstadt's Double Platinum-certified, first Spanish-language album, Canciones de Mi Padre.

"The reason I did it is selfish," Ronstadt said in an interview. "I had started to make a record in English, but I didn't like it and put it away. I found myself sleeping and dreaming in Spanish, and these songs were driving me crazy. I kept waking up in the middle of the night thinking that the musicians who know this music are old, and if they go I won't have anybody to help me do it. I didn't dare put it off another minute."

The album, according to Ronstadt, "concentrated more on trio and ensemble singing than did its predecessor." For the vocal trios, Ronstandt was joined by her two brothers, Pete and Mike. Pete Ronstadt at the time was the chief of police in Tucson, Arizona, where Mike owned a hardware store. Except for the professional guitar-playing, Ronstadt said, the arrangements are the same as those they sang in the living room when they were growing up.

Mas Canciones won Linda the 1993 Grammy Award for Best Mexican/Mexican-American Album.

Reception

In his AllMusic review, critic Stephen Thomas Erlewine called the album a "thoroughly enjoyable collection of Spanish and Mexican songs that is arguably stronger than its predecessor, since Ronstadt sounds more comfortable with the material than ever before."

Track listing

Personnel
Linda Ronstadt – vocals
Pete Ronstadt – vocals
Michael J. Ronstadt – vocals
Leonel Gálvez – guitar
Gilberto Puente – guitar
Pedro García – violin
Flaco Jiménez – accordion
Angela Koregelos – flute
Martin Lara – trumpet
Juan José Almaguer – choir, chorus, violin
Jesús Guzmán – choir, chorus, violin
Santiago Maldonado – choir, chorus, harp
José Martínez – choir, chorus
Rafael Palomar – choir, chorus, guitar
Juan Morales – choir, chorus
Nati Cano – violin
Víctor "El Pato" Cárdenas – vihuela
José Martínez, Jr. – violin
Katie McElrath – flute
Mario Rodríguez – violin
Federico Torres – trumpet
Production notes:
George Massenburg – producer, engineer, mixing
Rubén Fuentes – producer, arranger, conductor
Doug Sax – mastering
Alan Yoshida – mastering
Nathaniel Kunkel – engineer
Kevin Scott – assistant engineer
Craig Silvey – assistant engineer
M.T. Silvia – assistant engineer
John Kosh – art direction, design
Gilbert Ronstadt – artwork, painting
Rossy Corsly – translation
Mercedes Dalton – translation
Linda Ronstadt – translation
William Coupon – photography

Charts

References 

1991 albums
Elektra Records albums
Linda Ronstadt albums
Grammy Award for Best Mexican/Mexican-American Album